The first season of Albanians Got Talent, started on October 15, in Top Channel. The season was hosted by Albana Osmani, famous Albanian-Presenter from Albania, and Benet Kaci former presenter in RTK from Kosovo. The judges of the show were Altin Basha (director of Albanian sitcom Portokalli), Rovena Dilo (Albanian singer) and Armend Rexhepagiqi (Albanian/Kosovan singer).

Semi-finals

Semi-final 1
Semi Final 1 started on 27 November 2010. Semi-Final 1 was one of 3 semi-finals, with over 11 talent participants from Albania, Kosovo, Italy & France. From the first semi-final were qualified 3 acts by 4. Televoters around Albania and Kosovo chose 4 favorites, while 2 of them were automatically in final, 2 other of them, the 3rd and 4th place were in the judge's hands. In this case the automatic finalists were (Random Order): Gjon Muharremaj and All stars, while the other top 4 were Drilon Hoxha and Cunat e rrugës. Armend Rexhepagiçi supported Cunat e rrugës, while Rovena & Altin supported Drilon Hoxha.
About the acts, the semi-final started with Engji Susuri from Prizren, Kosovo, she performed "Proud Mary" by Tina Turner, the judge's comments were good, but by Rovena's comment, the song-orchestration choice wasn't a good choice, because including to her the song started slowly and blasted in the rhythm version of it, anyway Engji couldn't make Top 4. The 2nd act was "Qendra e fëmijëve, Mirditë" (Kids center of Mirdita) from Mirdita, who performed Brahms, a Hungarian dance with Albanian folkloric instruments, by judges comments they were quiet good, but couldn't make top 4. In the 3rd act, was a really entertainment 4 year-old talented boy from Tirana who is known as the Geography guy, knowing "ALL" the capital countries of the world. The judge's loved him and asked him hard questions but it seems he knew everything. 4th Act was Lec Patoku and Elisabetta Bianchi, an Albanian and Italian troupe dancing ballet, by judges they were really good but public didn't put them on top 4.
5th act was "One of the best" by judges comments, talking about Gjon Muharremaj, a 12-year-old boy from Switzerland. He sang French big songs in auditions and also semi-final and won the hear of the public. Altin Basha press the buzz because of the dancers, and screamed twice to the choreographers. 6th act was also favorites since the first audition, it's about "All Stars" 4 young guys from 4 Albanian cities, who presented a remix of many songs and performances, they won the public heart and won a place for final. Judge's comment were pretty good.
The 7th act was the illusionist Edmond Muraj, from Albania who made some illusions with her wife by disappearing her. Edmod performed only in Greece and this was his 2nd time in Albanians Got Talent, but couldn't win Albanian public heart.
8th act was an Albanian girl from Italy, who came especially for Albanians Got Talent, she sang "A Song for You" by Leon Russell but couldn't be in Albanian public hearts, and couldn't make it for Top 4.
9th act was one of 3-4 acts who were in top 4 and the one that won the judge's votes by Rovena & Altin, it's about Drilon Hoxha, comedian and beatboxer from Albania, in the first audition he performed an Erotic Beatbox, but changed it to a political-comedy. He performed "Sali Berisha", "Alfred Moisiu" with his friend performed also "Edi Rama" etc.
10th act was Eduardo Kondaçki, he actually predicted to be one of the ones to win, but it actually didn't seem like that, he couldn't make it to top 4. He sang Italian classical song with his pianist and violinist cousins.
The final act of the night was very entertainment, were 5 kids from "Cunat e rruges" known in English as the "Street Boys". They got the top 4 but got only a vote from Armend Rexhepagiçi. The judge's comments after the performance were really good.

Special guest: Albanian orchestra in Shkodër, called as "The Albanian Door Orchestra"

Semi-final 2
Second week of Albanian Semi-Final, started on November 3, Friday Night. In the 2nd night competed 11 participants, where 3 of them qualified to the grand final, 2 automatically by public, and one by judge's vote. After all the participants made their performance the judge's comments about 2nd week, wasn't quiet good, comparing to 1st week, this week there were too many buzzes but in the same time many new talents.

Special guest: Top Channel girl-orchestra.

Semi-final 3

Final
So Far Finalists:
 Gjon Muharremaj
 All Stars
 Drilon Hoxha
 Orget Sadiku (AGT Winner)

2010 Albanian television seasons
Albanians Got Talent
2010 Albanian television series debuts